There are a number of stadiums and venues known under the name of Estadio Monumental (Monumental Stadium) in different Spanish- and Portuguese-speaking countries:

Estadio Mâs Monumental in Buenos Aires, Argentina
Estadio Monumental David Arellano, in Santiago, Chile
Estadio Monumental de Condebamba, in Abancay, Peru
Estadio Monumental de Jauja, in Jauja, Peru.
Estadio Monumental de Maturín in Maturín, Venezuela
Estadio Monumental Isidro Romero Carbo in Guayaquil, Ecuador
Estadio Monumental "U" in Lima, Peru
Estadio Monumental Universidad Andina de Juliaca, or Estadio Monumental de la UANCV, in Juliaca, Peru 
Estadio Monumental Virgen de Chapi a.k.a. UNSA Stadium, in Arequipa, Peru
Estadio Cuscatlán in San Salvador, El Salvador
Monumental Río Parapití, Pedro Juan Caballero, Paraguay
Estádio Couto Pereira in Curitiba, Brazil
Estádio Olímpico Monumental in Porto Alegre, Brazil

See also

 La Monumental, the Plaza Monumental de Barcelona, a stadium bullring in the city of Barcelona, Spain

Monumental (disambiguation)